Nigel Hemming is a British artist, specialising in animal portraits and artwork. He was born in 1957 in Staffordshire. Initially a painter of birds, it was his paintings of dogs which became the more famous.

He has been described as "one of the UK’s most famous canine artists" and one of the most successful.

Awards and notable works
 1996 - Published Artist of the Year by the Fine Art Trade Guild.

References

20th-century British painters
British male painters
21st-century British painters
Animal artists
1957 births
Living people
20th-century British male artists
21st-century British male artists